Pierre Michael "Rocky" Simpson (born 1955 or 1956) is a Canadian politician, who was elected to the Legislative Assembly of the Northwest Territories in the 2019 election. He represents the electoral district of Hay River South.

He is the father of fellow MLA Rocky "R. J." Simpson, who represents Hay River North. Prior to his election to the legislature, Simpson was the owner of Concept Energy Services, a local business which constructs modular buildings; however, shortly after the election, Concept Energy Services was revealed to be $4 million in debt, including nearly $2 million owed to the territorial government's own Business Development and Investment Corporation.

References 

Living people
Members of the Legislative Assembly of the Northwest Territories
People from Hay River
21st-century Canadian politicians
Year of birth missing (living people)